Amorphoscelis chinensis is a species of praying mantis found in China.

References

Amorphoscelis
Insects of China
Insects described in 1937